Kaltag Airport  is a state-owned public-use airport located one nautical mile (1.85 km) southwest of the central business district of Kaltag, a city in the Yukon-Koyukuk Census Area of the U.S. state of Alaska.

Facilities 

Airlines and destinations 

The following airlines offer scheduled passenger service at this airport:

Prior to its bankruptcy and cessation of all operations, Ravn Alaska served the airport from multiple locations.

Top destinations

References

External links 
 FAA Alaska airport diagram (GIF)
 

Airports in the Yukon–Koyukuk Census Area, Alaska